The Battle of Hondo Castle (December 29, 1637) was a victory for the rebel peasants and ronin during Shimabara Rebellion. After a successful uprising in Shimabara Domain, several thousand of rebels crossed the sea to the nearby Amakusa islands, domain of the Terazawa family, to help the local Christians who rose to arms at the same time. The local Terazawa samurai, overconfident and believing they had to deal with their own peasants only, attacked the rebels on the open field and suffered terrible loses. The surviving Terazawa soldiers took refuge in Tomioka Castle, which was attacked within a few days.

Prelude 
In the end of November 1637, a combination of several poor harvests, violent collection of arbitrary doubled taxes and persecution of Christianity (which existed in Kyushu since 1549. but was outlawed in 1614) among local peasants led to violent uprising of starving peasants, Christians and ronin on the Shimabara Domain, property of Matsukura family. The rebels, organized and led by several ronins, formerly in the service of Konishi Yukinaga, and Amakusa Shiro, a charismatic Christian youth, defeated the punitive expedition of Matsukura samurai on 12 December 1637 and besieged Shimabara Castle, capital of their domain.

At the same time, on December 12, 1637, Christian peasants rose to arms on the nearby Amakusa Islands, domain of Terazawa family, and took Oyano, the smallest of Amakusa Islands, burning several Buddhist temples there. Rebels of Oyano on December 16 collected a small flotilla of 14 fishing boats and attacked nearby villages near Uto, in the domain of Hosokawa family, in order to rescue the family of Amakusa Shiro, which was living there, and spread the rebellion. However, rebels were repelled by local villagers and Hosokawa samurai, and Amakusa Shiro's relatives were imprisoned by the government forces.

Battle 
After he was informed of the Christian rebellion in Oyano, and with his own villagers starting to arm themselves, gather and profess their Christianity openly, Miyake Tobee, the governor of Lower Amakusa and castellan of Tomioka Castle, requested reinforcements from his superiors of the House Terazawa. In response, a fleet of 37 cargo boats with some 1500 Terazawa soldiers set sail from Karatsu (on the northern side of Kyushu) and reached Tomioka Castle on December 28. Confident in his strength, and believing that he will face only the rebels from Amakusa Islands, who's number he estimated at several hunded at most, Miyake left Tomioka Castle with his army and marched across the island to the small Hondo Castle, from where he intended to attack the rebels in the open battle. However, without his knowledge, a large army of rebels from Shimabara, numbering some 2000-6000 men, have secretly sailed from Shimabara to Lower Amakusa, carried by some 50-100 fishing boats with wooden crosses fixed to their prowls.

At dawn of 29 December, Miyake sent several hundred of his men across to Upper Amakusa, which was separated from the Lower Amakusa by a shallow strait less than 200 m wide. But the samurai vanguard stumbled into literally thousands of rebels and was almost completely annihilated. Around 10 am, a strong force of several thousands of rebels disembarked from their boats just north of the Hondo Castle. At the same time, another large group of rebels approached  from the south-east, marching on foot across the narrow strait linking Upper Amakusa to Lower. As Hondo Castle was a little more than a fortified mansion on a hill, Miyake decided to leave the castle and attack the rebels in the open field, believing in the superiority of his men's weapons and armor, as most of the rebels were still armed with farm implements and garden tools. In order to prevent both rebel groups from joining forces, Miyake tried to destroy the southern group first, which had assembled on the southern bank of Machiyamahuchi river, with a single bridge across. However, the rebels had more than a hundred arquebuses, and managed to hold the bridge long enough for the northern group to arrive. Caught from two sides, and forced into hand-to-hand battle with the rebels several times their number, Terazawa samurai collapsed and fled. Contemporary sources cite the government losses as 5 commanders, 12 important samurai and at least several hundred footmen.

Aftermath 
Surviving government troops fled to Tomioka Castle, which was besieged in a couple of days. Amakusa Shiro joined the victorious rebels at Hondo on 30 December, and was welcomed as supreme leader by the rebel army. A local merchant described him as wearing a plain kimono under an embroidered white robe, with a cross painted on his forehead, a crown made of Chinese ramie grass (Boehmeria nivea) and a wand adorned with hemp and paper streamers like those used by Shinto clerics, which he used to command the forces around him.

References 

Conflicts in 1637
17th-century rebellions
Rebellions in Japan
History of Christianity in Japan
1637 in Japan
Battles involving Japan
17th-century military history of Japan
Coordinates on Wikidata